The electoral district of Central Launceston, sometimes referred to as Launceston Central, was a single-member electoral district of the Tasmanian House of Assembly. It was based in the centre of Launceston, Tasmania's second city, and its inner suburbs.

The seat had two separate existences. It was initially created ahead of the 1871 election and abolished at the 1886 election. It was then recreated ahead of the 1903 election, and was abolished when the Tasmanian parliament adopted the Hare-Clark electoral model in 1909.

Members for Central Launceston

References
 
 
 Parliament of Tasmania (2006). The Parliament of Tasmania from 1956

Launceston Central